The Arsenal Middle  School (previously Arsenal Junior High School) is located in the Lower Lawrenceville neighborhood of Pittsburgh, Pennsylvania.

History and architectural features
Built in 1932, this historic structure was erected on the site of a former United States arsenal that was used during the War of 1812 by William Barclay Foster, the founder of Lawrenceville and the father of musician Stephen Foster.

A wing for elementary students was added in 1939.

This school was listed on the National Register of Historic Places in 1986.

References

External links
 Pittsburgh Arsenal 6-8

School buildings on the National Register of Historic Places in Pennsylvania
Middle schools in Pittsburgh
Neoclassical architecture in Pennsylvania
School buildings completed in 1932
City of Pittsburgh historic designations
Pittsburgh History & Landmarks Foundation Historic Landmarks
Defunct schools in Pennsylvania
1932 establishments in Pennsylvania
National Register of Historic Places in Pittsburgh
Lawrenceville (Pittsburgh)